Mass Megawatts Wind Power, Inc. is a company that produces wind turbines and sells wind-generated electricity. The company intends to build and operate wind energy power plants and plans to sell the electricity to the electric power exchange. Mass Megawatts Wind Power was founded on May 27, 1997 and is headquartered in Worcester, Massachusetts, United States. As well as developing its own proprietary wind power systems it also engages in distributing wind generated electricity it purchases wholesale. 

In late 2014, the company announced plans to enter the American solar power market. The Solar Tracking System (STS) utilizes minimal moving parts and electrical components, resulting in increased stability and lower operating costs. The STS claims to improve solar energy production levels by more than 20%.

See also
 Alternative energy
 Solar power
 Energy in the United States

References

Solar energy companies of the United States
Engineering companies of the United States
Companies traded over-the-counter in the United States